Rupert Obholzer (born 27 March 1970 in Cape Town) is a British rower. He was educated at Hampton School along with Johnny and Greg Searle and then St Catherine's College, Oxford, where he stroked the dark blue boat to victory in the 1991 Boat Race. He won a bronze medal at the 1996 Olympic Games in the four with Jonny Searle, Greg Searle and Tim Foster. He was later umpire of the Oxford and Cambridge Boat Race.
He trained as a doctor while rowing, and is now a consultant ear nose and throat surgeon at Guys Hospital specialising in diseases of the ear and base of the skull.

References

External links
 
 

1970 births
Living people
British male rowers
Sportspeople from Cape Town
Rowers at the 1992 Summer Olympics
Rowers at the 1996 Summer Olympics
Olympic bronze medallists for Great Britain
Olympic rowers of Great Britain
Olympic medalists in rowing
People educated at Hampton School
Alumni of St Catherine's College, Oxford
World Rowing Championships medalists for Great Britain
Medalists at the 1996 Summer Olympics